The Big Midweek: Life Inside the Fall is the 2014 autobiography by the Irish-born, English rock bassist Steve Hanley, co-written with Olivia Piekarski and published by Route Publishing. Hanley was the long-term bass player and a core music writer in The Fall from 1979 to 1998, and is widely regarded for shaping the band's sound. With Peter Hook, Andy Rourke and Gary Mounfield, he is considered one of the most important bassists of his generation.

Despite his huge contribution to late 20th century alternative music, Hanley has shied from the limelight, and has been rarely interviewed. The book received acclaim for its "brilliant" writing, "juicy details", and dry humour.

Content
The autobiography dissuades that Fall musicians were interchangeable; in the band, Hanley was second only to the often tyrannical, founding vocalist Mark E. Smith in longevity. Hanley wrote the music for over 100 songs on more than a dozen Fall albums; including the tracks "Rowche Rumble", "Fiery Jack", "Container Drivers", "Lie Dream of a Casino Soul", "Totally Wired", "Winter", "The N.W.R.A.", "I Am Damo Suzuki", "U.S. 80's-90's", "Carry Bag Man", "Jerusalem", "Van Plague?", "Yes, O Yes", "Bad News Girl", "Free Range", through to the 90s classic "Bill is Dead".

The book details the Fall's steady rise to prominence in the late 1970 and early 80s, their song writing techniques, his approach to bass playing, and Smith's often acrimonious relationship with other core Fall members. It ends in 1998 when Hanley led a walk off stage during an infamous incident when Smith interfered with the musician's monitor settings, leading to a punch up.

Reception
Hanley's autobiography has received widespread acclaim from music critics, literary critics, and fans. Speaking of the book's tone, co-writer Piekarski said, "We did have to have a winge-ometer when we were reading through the first draft”. Hanley wryly concedes that by the end of his tenure in the Fall he felt institutionalized, and that early drafts of the book had "more moaning than Morrissey".

References

Sources
Hanley, Steve. The Big Midweek: Life Inside the Fall. London: Route, 2014.

External links
 Life in The Fall – interview with Hanley, Brix Smith and Mark Riley
 The Fall – "Totally Wired" (Live in New York, June 1981)

2014 non-fiction books
The Fall (band)
British autobiographies
Music autobiographies
Debut books
English-language books